Animalization is the fourth American album by British rock group The Animals, and was released in August 1966 on MGM Records. It has a track listing somewhat similar to the British album Animalisms. The album, which reached #20 on the US Billboard album chart, included three US Top 40 singles, and was the first Animals album to have some tracks mixed in true stereo.

It was during this period that drummer John Steel left the group and was replaced by Barry Jenkins, previously of The Nashville Teens (of "Tobacco Road" fame). Both drummers appear on the cover, Jenkins on the front (upper right in brown shirt) and Steel on the back. In addition, it was also during this period that Mickie Most stepped down as the group's producer and was replaced by Tom Wilson.

Track listing

Side one

Personnel
The Animals
Eric Burdon – vocals 
Dave Rowberry – keyboards 
Hilton Valentine – guitar 
Chas Chandler – bass 
John Steel – drums except as indicated below
Barry Jenkins - drums on "Don't Bring Me Down", "Cheating" and "See See Rider"
Technical
Val Valentin - engineer

References

1966 albums
The Animals albums
Albums produced by Tom Wilson (record producer)
MGM Records albums